Bulak (Bulag) is a rural locality (an ulus) in Kizhinginsky District, Republic of Buryatia, Russia. The population was 202 as of 2010. There are 3 streets.

Geography 
Bulak is located 56 km northeast of Kizhinga (the district's administrative centre) by road. Chesan is the nearest rural locality.

References 

Rural localities in Kizhinginsky District